The Luzon hornbill (Penelopides manillae), sometimes called Luzon tarictic hornbill, is a species of hornbill in the family Bucerotidae. It is endemic to forests on Luzon and nearby islands in the northern Philippines. As is the case with all Philippine tarictic hornbills, it has been considered a subspecies of P. panini.

Taxonomy
The Luzon hornbill was described by the French polymath Georges-Louis Leclerc, Comte de Buffon in 1780 in his Histoire Naturelle des Oiseaux. The bird was also illustrated in a hand-coloured plate engraved by François-Nicolas Martinet in the Planches Enluminées D'Histoire Naturelle which was produced under the supervision of Edme-Louis Daubenton to accompany Buffon's text.  Neither the plate caption nor Buffon's description included a scientific name but in 1783 the Dutch naturalist Pieter Boddaert coined the binomial name Buceros manillae in his catalogue of the Planches Enluminées. The type locality is Manila in the Philippines. The Luzon hornbill is now placed in the genus Penelopides that was introduced in 1849 by the German naturalist Ludwig Reichenbach in a plate of the hornbills. The origin of the generic name is uncertain but it may be a combination of the Latin pene meaning "almost" or "nearly", the Ancient Greek lophos meaning "crest" and -oideēs "resembling". The specific epithet manillae is a Latinized form of "Manila".

There are two subspecies: the relatively widespread nominate subspecies, and subniger from the islands of Polillo and Patnanongan. It was hunted for meat, but is now considered to be safe, as a new hunting ban has been enforced.

In captivity

This species is kept in captivity.  Jurong Bird Park keeps some specimens in their hornbill complex.  There are two pairs in two different aviaries and Jurong bred the species on one occasion.  Safari World in Thailand also has some Luzon hornbills, and several zoos in the Philippines have achieved some success in breeding them.  San Diego Wild Animal Park used to keep and breed the species, but now the only ones outside Asia are kept at zoos in Berlin and Frankfurt.  Berlin keeps the nominate subspecies and Frankfurt have a pair of the subniger. There have been problems with tarictic hornbills in captivity because all species were previously considered conspecific. For example, the birds at Frankfurt are listed as subniger but do not have the correct bill colouration.

Gallery

References

Luzon hornbill
Birds of Luzon
Luzon hornbill
Taxonomy articles created by Polbot